Plagiometriona is a genus of tortoise beetles in the family Chrysomelidae. Several species occurring in Central and North America have sometimes been classified under a separate genus, Helocassis, but North American researchers continue to treat Helocassis as a junior synonym.

Selected species
 Plagiometriona ambigena
 Plagiometriona bremei (Boheman, 1855)
 Plagiometriona buqueti (Boheman, 1855)
 Plagiometriona clavata (Fabricius, 1798)
 Plagiometriona costaricensis
 Plagiometriona crucipennis (Boheman, 1855)
 Plagiometriona diffusa
 Plagiometriona distorta (Boheman, 1855)
 Plagiometriona dodonea
 Plagiometriona dorsosignata
 Plagiometriona flavescens
 Plagiometriona flexuosa (Boheman, 1855)
 Plagiometriona forcipata
 Plagiometriona gibbifera
 Plagiometriona herbea
 Plagiometriona latemarginata
 Plagiometriona losi
 Plagiometriona moesta (Boheman, 1855)
 Plagiometriona paleacea
 Plagiometriona palmeirensis
 Plagiometriona ramosa (Boheman, 1855)
 Plagiometriona sahlbergi
 Plagiometriona stillata
 Plagiometriona tenella
 Plagiometriona tortuguilla
 Plagiometriona tredecimguttata
 Plagiometriona vigens
 Plagiometriona zelleri (Boheman, 1855)

References

Cassidinae